Kolaabad (also Romanized as Kolāābād; also known as Kolāhābād and Qāsemābād) is a village in Hoseynabad Rural District, Esmaili District, Anbarabad County, Kerman Province, Iran. At the 2006 census, its population was 358, in 67 families.

References 

Populated places in Anbarabad County